Barry Elsby is a British born, Falkland Islands doctor and politician, who has served as a Member of the Legislative Assembly for the Stanley constituency since a by-election in 2011 which filled the seat vacated by Emma Edwards. He won re-election in 2013 and 2017.

Elsby first came to the Falklands with his family in 1990, initially on a two-year contract. He works at the King Edward VII Memorial Hospital in Stanley as a general practitioner, specialising in Cancer Research. Before his election to the Legislative Assembly, Elsby was a member of the Media Trust, acting as the Chief Medical Officer on several occasions and was elected by parents to the Board of Education.

References

Year of birth missing (living people)
Living people
Falkland Islands medical doctors
Falkland Islands MLAs 2009–2013
Falkland Islands MLAs 2013–2017
Falkland Islands MLAs 2017–2021
Welsh emigrants to the Falkland Islands